The Riverside Baptist Church (RBC) is a Baptist church located in Jacksonville, Florida, at 2650 Park Street in the Riverside neighborhood. It is affiliated with the Association of Welcoming and Affirming Baptists, Alliance of Baptists and the Cooperative Baptist Fellowship.

History 
Designed by architect Addison Mizner and completed in 1926, it was added to the U.S. National Register of Historic Places on September 22, 1972. On April 18, 2012, the American Institute of Architects's Florida Chapter placed the building on its list of Florida Architecture: 100 Years. 100 Places.

Theology
Riverside Baptist is a progressive Baptist church serving a small, but diverse congregation. According to the church website, the congregation is "an inclusive open and affirming community of believers without regard for race, sexual orientation, ethnicity, age, gender, or disability, all with a diversity of gifts and experiences united under the Lordship of Jesus Christ." It is associated with the Association of Welcoming and Affirming Baptists. As a progressive Baptist church, Riverside welcomes women and LGBTQIA+ people to serve as pastors and deacons, appointing its first openly transgender deacon in November of 2022. The church is fully welcoming to LGBTQIA+ members. Riverside Baptist Church is a partner church with the Alliance of Baptists and the Cooperative Baptist Fellowship.

Conflict with the Florida Baptist Convention
In 2009, Dr. John Sullivan, executive director of the Florida Baptist Convention, requested a meeting with Riverside's pastor at that time, Rev. David Holladay. The purpose of this meeting was to discuss Riverside's acceptance of LGBTQ people. Riverside accepts homosexuality as a legitimate God-given identity, while the Florida Baptist Convention defines it as sinful. The meeting ended with the two parties agreeing to disagree. Riverside Baptist Church no longer identifies itself as a Southern Baptist-affiliated church.

The Building
The sanctuary combines Romanesque, Byzantine, and Spanish elements, and is a splendid example of what is colloquially called the "Florida Spanish" style. It is one and a half stories, limestone with gabled and hipped tile roof sections, a double-door entrance beneath compound round arch, and sculptured tympanum. The design is believed to be Mizner's only religious structure. The radical nature of the design caused the loss of some members after its completion.

References

External links

Florida's Office of Cultural and Historical Programs
Duval County listings
Riverside Baptist Church

Affirming Baptist churches in the United States
Churches in Jacksonville, Florida
Baptist churches in Florida
History of Jacksonville, Florida
National Register of Historic Places in Jacksonville, Florida
Churches on the National Register of Historic Places in Florida
Spanish Colonial Revival architecture in Florida
Addison Mizner buildings
Historic American Buildings Survey in Florida
1926 establishments in Florida
Churches completed in 1926